Martin James Landau (June 20, 1928 – July 15, 2017) was an American actor, acting coach, producer, and editorial cartoonist. His career began in the 1950s, with early film appearances including a supporting role in Alfred Hitchcock's North by Northwest (1959). His career breakthrough came with leading roles in the television series Mission: Impossible (1966–1969) and Space: 1999 (1975–1977).

Landau earned Academy Award nominations for his performances in Tucker: The Man and His Dream (1988) and Woody Allen's Crimes and Misdemeanors (1989). He won the Academy Award for Best Supporting Actor as well as the Screen Actors Guild Award and a Golden Globe Award for his portrayal of Bela Lugosi in Ed Wood (1994). Other notable roles include in Cleopatra (1963), The Greatest Story Ever Told (1965), Rounders (1998), Sleepy Hollow (1999), and Remember (2015). He headed the Hollywood branch of the Actors Studio until his death in July 2017.

Early life
Landau was born on June 20, 1928, in Brooklyn, New York, the son of Selma (née Buchman) and Morris Landau. His family was Jewish. His father was an Austrian-born machinist who tried to rescue relatives from the Nazis.

After attending both James Madison High School and Pratt Institute, he found work at the New York Daily News. There he spent the next five years as an editorial cartoonist and worked alongside Gus Edson to produce the comic strip The Gumps. He quit the Daily News when he was 22 to concentrate on theater acting. "I told the picture editor I was going into the theater," he recalled. "I think he thought I was going to be an usher."

After auditioning for the Actors Studio in 1955, Landau and Steve McQueen were the only applicants accepted out of 500 who applied. While there, he trained under Lee Strasberg, Elia Kazan, and Harold Clurman, and eventually became an executive director with the Studio alongside Mark Rydell and Sydney Pollack.

Career

1957-1965: Early roles, North by Northwest

Influenced by Charlie Chaplin and the escapism of the cinema, Landau pursued an acting career. He attended the Actors Studio, becoming good friends with James Dean. He recalled, "James Dean was my best friend. We were two young would-be and still-yet-to-work unemployed actors, dreaming out loud and enjoying every moment ... We'd spend lots of time talking about the future, our craft and our chances of success in this newly different, ever-changing modern world we were living in."

In 1957, he made his Broadway debut in Middle of the Night. Landau made his first major film appearance in Alfred Hitchcock's North by Northwest (1959) as Leonard, the right-hand man of a criminal portrayed by James Mason. He had featured roles in two 1960s epics, Cleopatra (1963) and The Greatest Story Ever Told (1965), and played a ruthless killer in the Western action adventure prequel Nevada Smith (1965) starring Steve McQueen.

1960s: Career breakthrough, Mission: Impossible

Landau played the supporting role of master of disguise Rollin Hand in the first three seasons of the US television series Mission: Impossible, from 1966 to 1969. Landau at first declined to be contracted by the show because he did not want it to interfere with his film career; instead, he was credited for "special guest appearances" during the first season. He became a full-time cast member in the second season, although the studio agreed to Landau's request, to contract him only on a year-by-year basis rather than the then-standard five years. The role of Hand required Landau to perform a wide range of accents and characters, from dictators to thugs, and several episodes had him playing dual roles—not only Hand's impersonation, but also the person whom Hand is impersonating. In the series Landau acted alongside his then-wife Barbara Bain, who won an Emmy for her performances each year for all three years. He was replaced by Leonard Nimoy, playing a very similar role but not exactly the same character, for the next two seasons of the series after Landau and Bain left the show.

1970-1987: Television appearances 
 
In 1973, Landau guest-starred in the Columbo episode Double Shock alongside Peter Falk. Landau plays twin brothers involved in the murder of their rich uncle. The episode also costarred Dabney Coleman, Julie Newmar, and Jeanette Nolan.

In the mid-1970s, Landau and Bain returned to TV in the British science-fiction series Space: 1999 produced by Gerry Anderson in partnership with Sylvia Anderson, and later with Fred Freiberger. Critical response to Space: 1999 was unenthusiastic during its original run, and it was cancelled after two seasons. Landau was critical of the scripts and storylines, especially during the series' second season, but praised the cast and crew. He later wrote forewords to Space: 1999 co-star Barry Morse's theatrical memoir Remember with Advantages (2006) and Jim Smith's critical biography of Tim Burton. Following Space: 1999, Landau appeared in supporting roles in a number of films and TV series. He appeared in low-budget genre pictures, such as the science fiction films Without Warning (1981) and The Being (1983) or the horror film Alone in the Dark (1982).  He appeared in roles in, among others, the TV film The Harlem Globetrotters on Gilligan's Island (1981), which co-starred Bain in their final on-screen appearance together.

1988-1995: Career resurgence and Oscar win 
In the late 1980s, Landau made a career comeback, earning an Academy Award nomination for his role in Tucker: The Man and His Dream (1988). He said he was grateful to the film's director, Francis Ford Coppola, for the opportunity to play a role he enjoyed: "I've spent a lot of time playing roles that didn't really challenge me," he said. "You want roles that have dimension. The role of Abe Karatz gave me that." He won the Golden Globe Award for his part in the film.

In 1989, Landau appeared in Woody Allen's Crimes and Misdemeanors (1989) The film is split into two stories: one humorous, one dark in nature. Landau starred in the darker storyline as Judah Rosenthal, a successful ophthalmologist who tries to prevent his mistress, played by Anjelica Huston, from revealing their affair to his wife (Claire Bloom). Landau's character confides his worries to patient and rabbi Sam Waterston as well as his mobster brother Jerry Orbach. Allen remembered of the cast that:

The film received critical acclaim, with Roger Ebert giving the film four stars, writing, "The movie generates the best kind of suspense, because it's not about what will happen to people—it's about what decisions they will reach. We have the same information they have. What would we do? How far would we go to protect our happiness and reputation? How selfish would we be? Is our comfort worth more than another person's life? Allen does not evade this question, and his answer seems to be, yes, for some people, it would be." Landau received an Academy Award nomination for Best Supporting Actor for this performance, losing to Denzel Washington in Glory.

He won an Oscar for Best Supporting Actor for his performance in Ed Wood (1994), a biopic in which Landau plays actor Bela Lugosi. Landau researched the role of Lugosi by watching many old Lugosi movies and studying Lugosi's Hungarian accent, which contributed to Lugosi's decline in acting. "I began to respect this guy and pity him," said Landau. "I saw the humor in him. This, for me, became a love letter to him, because he never got a chance to get out of that. I got a chance to make a comeback in my career. And I'm giving him one. I'm giving him the last role he never got."

Landau also received a Screen Actors Guild Award, a Golden Globe Award and a Saturn Award for the role, as well as accolades from a number of critics' groups.

Landau's film roles in the 1990s included a down-on-his-luck Hollywood producer in the comedy Mistress (1992) with Robert De Niro, and judges in the dramas City Hall (1995) with Al Pacino, Rounders (1998) with Matt Damon, and Ready to Rumble in 1999. He played Geppetto in The Adventures of Pinocchio (1996).

Landau provided the voice of Scorpion for the first two seasons of the 1990s Spider-Man television series. Landau left the series after two seasons when he won the Academy Award and lacked time for the series; Richard Moll was recast as Scorpion.

He played the part of Jacob, son of Isaac, in the TV miniseries Joseph, alongside Ben Kingsley as Potiphar and Paul Mercurio as Joseph.

2000–2017: Continued roles 
He played a supporting role in The Majestic (2001), starring Jim Carrey. The film received mostly negative reviews, although one reviewer wrote that "the lone outpost of authenticity is manned by Martin Landau, who gives a heartfelt performance," as an aging father who believes that his missing son has returned from World War II.

In the early seasons of Without a Trace (2002–2009), Landau was nominated for a Primetime Emmy Award for his portrayal of the Alzheimer's-afflicted father of FBI Special Agent in Charge Jack Malone, the series' lead character. In 2006, he made a guest appearance in the series Entourage as Bob Ryan, a washed-up but determined and sympathetic Hollywood producer attempting to relive his glory days, a portrayal that earned him a second Emmy nomination.

Landeau appeared in The Aryan Couple (2004 film), in which he played Joseph Krauzenberg, a very wealthy Hungarian Jewish industrial tycoon.

Landau appeared in the television film Have a Little Faith (2011) based on Mitch Albom's book of the same name, in which he played Rabbi Albert Lewis. In 2012, Landau voiced Mr. Rzykruski in the Tim Burton animated Disney film Frankenweenie. In 2015, Landau starred alongside Christopher Plummer in the film Remember. The film received critical praise, with reviewers lauding Landau's and Plummer's performlances.

In recognition of his services to the motion picture industry, Landau has a star on the Hollywood Walk of Fame at 6841 Hollywood Boulevard.

Acting coach
Encouraged by his own mentor, Lee Strasberg, Landau also taught acting. Actors coached by him include Jack Nicholson and Anjelica Huston.

Personal life
Landau married actress and former co-star Barbara Bain on January 31, 1957. They had two daughters, Susan and Juliet. Landau and Bain divorced in 1993.

Death
On July 15, 2017, Landau died at age 89 at the Ronald Reagan UCLA Medical Center in Westwood, Los Angeles, California; he had been briefly hospitalized. The cause of death was hypovolemic shock brought on by internal bleeding and heart disease. Landau is buried at the Beth David Cemetery in Elmont, New York.

Filmography

Awards and nominations

Citations

General and cited references

External links

 
 
 
 
 Martin Landau at the University of Wisconsin's Actors Studio audio collection
 Martin Landau at The Total Picture Seminar

1928 births
2017 deaths
American male film actors
American male television actors
American male stage actors
American male voice actors
20th-century American male actors
21st-century American male actors
Best Supporting Actor Academy Award winners
Best Supporting Actor Golden Globe (film) winners
Outstanding Performance by a Male Actor in a Supporting Role Screen Actors Guild Award winners
Jewish American male actors
Male actors from New York City
Male actors from Los Angeles
American acting coaches
Method actors
American comic strip cartoonists
Pratt Institute alumni
People from Brooklyn
People from West Hollywood, California
American people of Austrian-Jewish descent
Burials at Beth David Cemetery
James Madison High School (Brooklyn) alumni
21st-century American Jews